Xanthoidea is a superfamily of crabs, comprising the three families Xanthidae, Panopeidae and Pseudorhombilidae. Formerly, a number of other families were included in Xanthoidea, but many of these have since been removed to other superfamilies. These include Carpilioidea, Eriphioidea, Hexapodoidea, Pilumnoidea and Trapezioidea. Even in this reduced state, Xanthoidea remains one of the most species-rich superfamilies of crabs.

Families
The World Register of Marine Species lists the following families:

Panopeidae Ortmann, 1893
Pseudorhombilidae Alcock, 1900
Xanthidae MacLeay, 1838

References

External links

 
Crabs
Arthropod superfamilies